Three Miles Up is a 1927 American silent action film directed by Bruce M. Mitchell. The film stars Al Wilson, William Malan and Ethlyne Clair. Three Miles Up was one of a series of films that showcased the exploits of the stunt pilots in Hollywood.

Plot
Dick Morgan (Al Wilson), formerly a professional crook, returns from the war as the "Ace" of his squadron and is met by his buddy, Dr. Worthing (William Malan).  Dick falls back into his old ways but is in love with Worthing's daughter, Nadine (Ethlyne Clair), and is determined to break his former criminal ties.

Threatened with exposure by his gang, Dick helps them in a jewel robbery.  By feigning death in an accident and undergoing an operation to remove an identifying scar, he is able to return to the crooks' rendezvous and take back the stolen money unrecognized.

In a climactic air battle, the gang is forced down with the money, and Dick overtakes the leader when he attempts to escape in a car with Nadine.

Cast

 Al Wilson as Dick Morgan ("Ace") 
 William Malan as John Worthing
 Ethlyne Clair as Nadine Worthing
 William Clifford as "Boss" Scanlon
 Frank Rice as Professor
 Billy "Red" Jones as Kid
 Joseph Bennett as Garrett
 Art Goebel as Pilot
 Archie Ricks as Pilot

Production
Al Wilson was not only the star of Three Miles Up but also flew as a "stunt pilot" in the film. After Wilson became a flying instructor and a short period as manager of the Mercury Aviation Company, founded by one of his students, Cecil B. DeMille, Wilson became more and more skilled in performing stunts, including wing-walking, and left the company to become a professional stunt pilot, specializing in Hollywood aviation films.

Production started on Three Miles Up in 1927 at the newly-established Wilson Aero Service at Glendale Airport, California. Art Goebel, another actor/pilot was involved. Wilson had joined with his brother, Roy, another pilot, to create a fixed-base operation that not only worked on Hollywood films but also offered charter and passenger flights.

Wilson worked together with stuntmen like Frank Clarke and Wally Timm and also for film companies, including Universal Pictures. After numerous appearances in stunt roles, he started his career as an actor in 1923 with the serial The Eagle's Talons. Wilson produced his own movies until 1927, when he went back to work with Universal.

Reception
Aviation film historian Stephen Pendo, in Aviation in the Cinema (1985) said Three Miles Up was only one of a long list of aviation films that showcased Wilson's talents. He alternately wrote, acted and flew in a career that "spanned more than 10 years, and he acted in more films than any other professional pilot."

In Three Miles Up , Pendo noted the aerial stunts featured Wilson who "as a former ace forced into crime and then trying to escape his situation." The film had Wilson in a spectacular stunt, jumping "from one plane to another by lassoing one aircraft and swinging on the rope."

References

Notes

Citations

Bibliography

 Pendo, Stephen. Aviation in the Cinema. Lanham, Maryland: Scarecrow Press, 1985. .
 Wynne, H. Hugh. The Motion Picture Stunt Pilots and Hollywood's Classic Aviation Movies. Missoula, Montana: Pictorial Histories Publishing Co., 1987. .

External links
 
 

1927 films
1920s action films
American action films
Films directed by Bruce M. Mitchell
American silent feature films
Associated Exhibitors films
American black-and-white films
1920s English-language films
1920s American films